Ian Davenport (born 8 July 1966) is an English abstract painter and former Turner Prize nominee.

Life and work
Ian Davenport was born in Sidcup, and studied art at the Northwich College of Art and Design in Cheshire and then at Goldsmiths College, where he graduated in 1988. HIs that year he exhibited in the Freeze exhibition organised by Damien Hirst. His first solo show was in 1990 and in the same year he was included in the British Art Show. In 1991, he was nominated for the annual Turner Prize.

Many of his works are made by pouring paint onto a tilted surface and letting gravity spread the paint over the surface.

For the Days Like These exhibition at Tate Britain in 2003, he made a thirteen-metre-high mural by dripping lines of differently-coloured paint down the wall from a syringe. In September 2006 he unveiled his largest public commission to date on Southwark Bridge, entitled Poured Lines: Southwark. He painted the West End Wall of the University of Oxford Department of Biochemistry.

Stylistic comparisons have been made between his work and that of Bridget Riley, Helen Frankenthaler and Callum Innes.

A monograph on him was published in 2014.

He is a Patron of Paintings in Hospitals, a charity that provides art for health and social care in England, Wales and Northern Ireland.

References

External links

 Ian Davenport Studio website

1966 births
Living people
20th-century English painters
English male painters
21st-century English painters
Alumni of Goldsmiths, University of London
People from Sidcup
English contemporary artists
Young British Artists
British abstract artists
20th-century English male artists
21st-century English male artists